The Adventures of the Bush Patrol (also known simply as Bush Patrol) is an Australian children's television series which first screened in 1996 on the Seven Network.

Plot
The series follows the adventures of Tracey, her brother Ben and their mother Maggie, who patrols the Katta-Moornda National Park as a Ranger.

Cast
 Wendy Strehlow as Maggie Dean
 Lisa Laird as Tracey Dean
 Steele Scriberas as Ben Dean
 Emma Booth as Dana Drysdale
 Rodney Bell as Tony Harrison
 Dylan Landre	Dom
 Kyle Morrison	Gully
 Blake Muir as Todd Catchpenny
 Belinda Pedler as Pepa
 Kate Whitbread as Kelly Davidson
 Gillian Alexy as Eloise
 Joseph Isaia as Mr. Clark
 Brook O'Keefe as Minnie Clark
 Kelton Pell as Wazza

References

External links
 
The Adventures of the Bush Patrol at Australian Television Information Archive

Australian children's television series
1996 Australian television series debuts
1998 Australian television series endings
Television shows set in Western Australia